Aitaré da Praia ("Aitaré of the Beach") is a 1925 Brazilian silent film directed by Gentil Roiz in the city of Recife. The romantic drama is also known as Raft of Death.

Synopsis 

A young man called Aitaré falls in love with a girl named Cora. One day during a raft trip, Aitaré saves the life of a rich Colonel (Felipe Rosa) and his daughter. Cora is disturbed by her enthusiasm and after some misunderstandings she decides to end their relationship when they return to the city. Five years later Aitaré will understand Cora's reasons.

Cast
José Amaro
Antonio Campos
Mario Cardoso
Queiroz Coutinho
Amália de Souza
Valderez de Souza
Rilda Fernandes
Claudio José
Mario Lima
Luiz Marques
Pedro Neves
Ary Severo
Tito Severo
J. Soares  (as Jota Soares)
Almery Steves
Rosa Temporal

External links
 Aitaré da Praia Synopsis
 

1925 films
Brazilian black-and-white films
Brazilian silent films
1925 drama films
Films shot in Recife
Brazilian drama films
Silent drama films